During the 1926–27 season Hearts competed in the Scottish First Division, the Scottish Cup and the East of Scotland Shield.

Fixtures

Scottish Cup

Scottish First Division

See also
List of Heart of Midlothian F.C. seasons

References

Statistical Record 26-27

External links
Official Club website

Heart of Midlothian F.C. seasons
Heart of Midlothian